Kuzminec may refer to:

 Kuzminec, Krapina-Zagorje County, a village near Mihovljan, Croatia
 Kuzminec, Koprivnica-Križevci County, a village near Rasinja, Croatia